In Greek mythology, the Myrmidons (or Myrmidones; , Murmidónes, singular: Μυρμῐδών, Murmidṓn) were an ancient Thessalian Greek tribe.

In Homer's Iliad, the Myrmidons are the soldiers commanded by Achilles. Their eponymous ancestor was Myrmidon, a king of Phthiotis who was a son of Zeus and "wide-ruling" Eurymedousa, a princess of Phthiotis. She was seduced by him in the form of an ant.

An etiological myth of their origins, simply expanding upon their supposed etymology—the name in Classical Greek was interpreted as "ant-people", from myrmedon (murmēdṓn, plural: μῠρμηδόνες, murmēdónes), which means "ant-nest"—was first mentioned by Ovid, in Metamorphoses. In Ovid's telling, the Myrmidons were simple worker-ants on the island of Aegina.

Ovid's myth of the repopulation of Aegina 
Hera, queen of the gods, sent a plague to kill all the human inhabitants of Aegina because the island was named for one of the lovers of Zeus. King Aeacus, a son of Zeus and the intended target of Hera along with his mother, prayed to his father for a means to repopulate the island.

As the myrmekes (Ancient Greek: μύρμηκες, múrmēkes, singular: μύρμηξ, múrmēx), the ants of the island, were unaffected by the sickness, Zeus responded by transforming them into a race of people, the Myrmidons. They were as fierce and hardy as ants, and intensely loyal to their leader. Because of their antly origins, they wore brown armour.

After a time, Aeacus exiled his two sons, Peleus and Telamon, for murdering their half-brother, Phocus.  Peleus went to Phthia and a group of Myrmidons followed him to Thessaly. Peleus's son, Achilles, brought them to Troy to fight in the Trojan War. They feature as the loyal followers of Achilles in most accounts of the Trojan War.

Another tradition states that the Myrmidons had no such remarkable beginnings, but were merely the descendants of Myrmidon, a Thessalian nobleman, who married Peisidice, the daughter of Aeolus, king of Thessaly. Myrmidon was the father of Actor and Antiphus. As king of Phthia, Actor (or his son) invited Peleus to stay in Thessaly.

Medieval Myrmidons 
Achilles was described by Leo the Deacon (born ca. 950) not as Hellene, but as Scythian, while according to the Byzantine author John Malalas (c. 491–578), his army was made up of a tribe previously known as Myrmidons and "known now as Bulgars". The 12th-century Byzantine poet John Tzetzes also identified the Myrmidons with the Bulgars, whom he also identified with the Paeonians, although the latter may be intended in a purely geographical sense. In the 11th century, Michael Attaleiates called the Rus' Myrmidons, but this usage did not catch on.

According to Andrew Ekonomous, these represent intentional distortions designed to "minimize the valor of pagan heroes, and eventually to extinguish their memory altogether". Anthony Kaldellis, on the other hand, argues that such use of classical ethnonyms for modern peoples "do not really fall under the category of distortion at all".

Modern Myrmidons 
The Myrmidons of Greek myth were known for their loyalty to their leaders, so that in pre-industrial Europe the word "myrmidon" carried many of the same connotations that "robot" does today.  "Myrmidon" later came to mean "hired ruffian", according to the Oxford English Dictionary.

 Henry Fielding in Tom Jones (1749, Book XV, ch. 5) employs the term in the sense of "hired thugs": "The door flew open, and in came Squire Western, with his parson and a set of myrmidons at his heels."
 The Royal Navy has had several ships called HMS Myrmidon.
 The United States Navy has had one vessel named USS Myrmidon (ARL-16)
 "The Myrmidons" was the name adopted in 1865 by a private dining society in Merton College, Oxford.  It is thought to be the oldest continuously active dining society in the University of Oxford.  Max Beerbohm was a member, and the club called "The Junta" that features in his Oxford novel Zuleika Dobson is probably modeled on the Myrmidons.  Other former members include Lord Randolph Churchill and Andrew Irvine.

See also 
 Myrmex, woman who became an ant

Notes

External links 
 Myrmidons at WSU
 Myrmidons at Timeless Myths
 Myrmidons at Online Mythology

 
Greek mythology
Mythological peoples
Metamorphoses into humanoids in Greek mythology